UVV Utrecht is a sports club based in Utrecht, Netherlands.  It was founded in 1902.  The club has teams in the following sports: football, tennis, baseball, softball and beach volleyball. 

The UVV baseball stadium has a capacity of 1,000. The UVV baseball branch is named UVV Pickies because of its sponsor.

2011 baseball roster

Greatest players 
  Marco van Basten
  Piet van Reenen
  Wout Buitenweg
  Harry van den Ham
  John van Loen
  Alje Schut
  Jan Vos
  Jan Willem van Ede
  Erik Tammer

References

External links
 UVV Official website (in Dutch)

Multi-sport clubs in the Netherlands
Football clubs in the Netherlands
Football clubs in Utrecht (city)
Sports clubs in Utrecht (city)
1902 establishments in the Netherlands
Sports clubs established in 1902